USS Paul Hamilton (DDG-60) is an  in the United States Navy currently in service. The ship is named after Paul Hamilton, the third United States Secretary of the Navy.

Construction and career 
Constructed at Bath Iron Works (BIW) in Bath, Maine, Paul Hamilton was commissioned in Charleston, South Carolina. The destroyer was transferred to Pearl Harbor, Hawaii after her commissioning. She is currently homeported in San Diego, California.

In July 2015, she along with the Royal Navy's , participated in airstrikes against ISIL.

In 2019, cargo ship Bass Strait, belonging to Hong Kong-based Pacific Basin Shipping Limited, launched a series of drones that surveilled and harassed Paul Hamilton in waters off of Southern California.

Gallery

References

External links

 Official USS Paul Hamilton (DDG-60) website

 

Ships built in Bath, Maine
Arleigh Burke-class destroyers
Destroyers of the United States
1993 ships